Dyson James Daniels (born 17 March 2003) is an Australian professional basketball player for the New Orleans Pelicans of the National Basketball Association (NBA). He was drafted eighth overall in the 2022 NBA draft.

Early life and career
Daniels was born in Bendigo,  Victoria and started playing basketball at age seven. He signed with the Bendigo Braves, his father's former team, of the NBL1 for the 2019 season. Later that year, Daniels joined the NBA Global Academy, a training center at the Australian Institute of Sport in Canberra. He helped Victoria win a silver medal at the 2021 Australian Under-20 Championships. Along with basketball, Daniels was a talented Australian rules footballer in his younger years and represented his home state of Victoria at several national football championships before giving up the sport to focus solely on basketball.

Professional career

NBA G League Ignite (2021–22) 
On 21 June 2021, Daniels signed with the NBA G League Ignite, a developmental team affiliated with the NBA G League. He turned down offers from several college programs and the National Basketball League Next Stars program. Daniels competed in the Rising Stars Challenge at 2022 NBA All-Star Weekend and helped his team win the title. In 26 games in the G League, he averaged 12 points, 7.1 rebounds, 5.1 assists and two steals per game. On 16 April 2022, Daniels declared for the 2022 NBA draft.

New Orleans Pelicans (2022–present) 
Daniels was selected with the eighth overall pick in the 2022 NBA Draft by the New Orleans Pelicans. Daniels joined the Pelicans' 2022 NBA Summer League roster. However, Daniels suffered a right-ankle sprain in the second quarter in the Pelicans' Summer League opener against the Portland Trail Blazers, forcing Daniels to be ruled as out for the rest of the Summer League. On July 9, 2022, Daniels signed a rookie scale contract with the Pelicans.

National team career
Daniels represented Australia at the 2018 FIBA Oceania Under-15 Championship in Papua New Guinea. He averaged 8.3 points, 3.7 rebounds, and 2.7 assists per game, helping his team win the gold medal. On 20 February 2021, a 17-year-old Daniels made his debut for the Australian senior national team at FIBA Asia Cup qualification. He recorded 23 points, six steals, and four assists in an 81–52 win over New Zealand.

Personal life
Daniels' dad, Ricky Daniels, is from the United States and played college basketball at NC State before embarking on a professional career. He was a two-time South East Australian Basketball League MVP with the Bendigo Braves, and his number was retired by the team. Daniels' older brother, Kai, plays college basketball at Regis University.

References

External links

2003 births
Living people
21st-century Australian people
Australian expatriate basketball people in the United States
Australian men's basketball players
Australian people of African-American descent
National Basketball Association players from Australia
NBA G League Ignite players
New Orleans Pelicans draft picks
New Orleans Pelicans players
Shooting guards
Sportspeople from Bendigo